Maria Rolf (born 1970) is a Swedish singer who's the singer of dansband Titanix.

In February 2010, she participated in the Sveriges dansband för Haiti aid, following an earthquake in Haiti.

On 18 July 2010, she won a Guldklaven Award in the category "female singer of the year" during Svenska dansbandsveckan in Malung.

References

1970 births
Dansband singers
Living people
21st-century Swedish singers
21st-century Swedish women singers